Breezand is a seaside resort and bungalow park of Vrouwenpolder in the Dutch province of Zeeland. It is a part of the municipality of Veere, and lies about 10 km north of Middelburg.

In 1930, the first recreational houses were built in the dunes near the Vrouwenpolder. The bungalow park Breezand was extended in the 1960 with hotels and shops and transformed in a seaside resort.

References
 

Populated places in Zeeland
Veere